The Business Transformation Agency (BTA) was an organization of the United States Department of Defense responsible for guiding the department's business operations modernization. The BTA was active from 2005 until its closure in 2011.

The agency aimed to foster business operations support for the American warfighter and seeks to provide accountability to the American taxpayer by systematically improving DoD's business processes, ERP systems and investment governance. Aiming to provide consistency, consolidation and coordination across the Department of Defense, the BTA produces the Enterprise Transition Plan (ETP)—an integrated and executable roadmap that observes the standards laid out in the Business Enterprise Architecture (BEA). The ETP and the BEA aimed to transform DoD business operations to achieve improved warfighter support while enabling financial accountability across the Department of Defense.

The Business Transformation Agency was established by Deputy Secretary of Defense Gordon R. England on October 7, 2005. The founding executives of the BTA were Co-directors Thomas Modly, Deputy Under Secretary of Defense for Financial Management, and Paul Brinkley, Deputy Under Secretary of Defense for Business Transformation; Director of Transformation Planning and Performance, David Fisher; Director of Transformation Priorities and Requirements, Radha Sekar; Director; Director of Investment Management, Paul Ketrick; Director of Warfighter Support, Bob Love; Director of Information and Federation Management, David Scantling; and Director of Agency Operations, Navy Captain Michael Murphy.

In August 2010, Secretary of Defense Robert Gates directed the inactivation of the BTA. The disestablishment of the agency was to be completed by September 2011.  In his speech, Secretary Gates said "The Business Transformation Agency was formally established in 2006 to foster the reform and modernization of this department's business practices. Since its creation, BTA, an agency that now employs approximately 360 people and spends $340 million a year, has shifted more of its focus to day-to-day oversight of individual acquisition programs, a function that can be performed by a number of other organizations.  Furthermore, the mission assigned to BTA has largely been legislatively assigned to other elements of the department."

Business transformation
In the last decades of the 20th century, the Department of Defense business model was configured to support a military dependent on large-scale weapons systems and prepared for sustained, predictable battlefield engagements in specific parts of the world. With the challenges that face the U.S. military in the 21st century, the DoD established the Business Transformation Agency to allow the defense business enterprise to adapt, flex, and react effectively to the needs of its modern joint warfighter.
Transformation seeks to make DoD business operations more agile, lean and rapid. The department called its approach to this need for transformation “federated”—meaning that uniformed and civilian leadership at all levels in the DoD were considered accountable for transformation progress. This effort was announced to be structured to support four strategic objectives:

 Develop and provide support for U.S. joint warfighting capability
 Enable rapid access to information for strategic decisions by fostering the development of interoperable and efficient ERP systems
 Reduce the cost of Defense Business operations
 Improve financial stewardship to the American people
The Defense Business Systems Management Committee, chaired by the Deputy Secretary of Defense, led the Transformation endeavor.  The BTA was intended to serve as a catalyst for transformation by coordinating and integrating transformation activity at the DoD enterprise level.  As of 2020, the Defense Business Systems Management Committee still functions to oversee development and management of business systems within the DoD.

Organization
The BTA was divided into 8 directorates organized around the functions of supporting defense business transformation.  Overseeing these directorates was Director David M. Fisher, author of Optimize Now (or else!), a guide to successful organizational transformation.

Defense Business Systems Acquisition Executive
The DBSAE provided direct oversight of 27 department-wide ERP programs. Notable among these programs are the Defense Travel System (DTS), the Defense Integrated Military Human Resources System (DIMHRS) and the Federal Voting Assistance Program (FVAP).

Enterprise Integration
EI worked to ensure fast adoption of DoD-wide information and process standards as defined in the BEA.  They sought to eliminate burdensome processes that hinder successful, speedy deployment of ERP capabilities within the DoD components.

Enterprise Planning and Investment
EP&I provided investment management leadership for DoD Enterprise-level business systems. It coordinates the efforts of DoD's acquisition policy as outlined in the DoD 5000 series pertaining to business systems. The Directorate also provides input for the Quadrennial Defense Review. EP&I is responsible for the Business Enterprise Architecture (BEA), the Enterprise Transition Plan (ETP), and the March Congressional Report (MCR). EP&I was the result of a merger of the former directorates Transformation Priorities & Requirements and Investment Management.

Priorities & Requirements – Financial Management
P&R-FM was the primary link to the Principal Staff Assistants within the Office of the Secretary of Defense (OSD) and other DoD-level organizations; in particular the Defense Finance and Accounting Service (DFAS) and Office of the Secretary of Defense (Comptroller). They ensured that the financial visibility priorities and requirements of these client organizations are reflected in the BEA and ETP, and in the guidance for business system investment management.

Priorities & Requirements – Human Resource Management
P&R-HRM was the primary link to the Office of the Under Secretary of Defense (Personnel and Readiness) regarding all human resource management related transformation activities.  They aligned functional priorities and requirements of these client organizations in the BEA and ETP, and in the guidance for business system investment management.

Priorities & Requirements – Supply Chain Management
P&R-SCM served as the primary link to the Principal Staff Assistants within the Office of the Secretary of Defense and other DoD-level organizations as they relate to Supply Chain Management. They ensure that functional priorities Material Visibility, Common Supplier Engagement, Acquisition Visibility, and Real Property Accountability are reflected in the BEA and the ETP, and in the guidance for business system investment management.

Warfighter Requirements
WR identified and resolved urgent DoD business issues that are directly affecting the troops. The WR also serves as an advocate for soldiers within the BTA. WR projects included economic roundtables that brought together organizations responsible for Mideast economic redevelopment with personnel who are about to be deployed to Iraq and Afghanistan. These roundtables established a working relationship that can be continued once they are deployed.

Chief of Staff
The office of the Chief of Staff provided operational support for the employees at the BTA. This included sections managing personnel, pay, planning, budgeting, infrastructure, IT, and internal management activities.

See also
Business Transformation

References

External links

DoD Deputy Chief Management Officer Website
DoD memo defining the organization of the BTA (PDF)

Government agencies established in 2006
2010 disestablishments in the United States
United States Department of Defense agencies